Scalibregma inflatum, also known as T headed worm, is a burrowing marine polychaete.  It is a cosmopolitan species that can be found from the Arctic to Antarctica, although most probably several species are confounded.

Morphology

Up to 6 cm long with an orange body with 50–60 segments. Body is composed of a wide anterior part of segments 15–17 and a long slim posterior part. Prostomium rectangular shaped with two lateral horns making it appear as a T. peristomium without chaetae. Parapodia small and oval at first increasing in size from segments 16–18. Four pairs of branching gills dorsally on 2-5 segment with chaetae.

Ecology

Mainly found in muddy substrate, but can also be found in sand and between stones and shells. S. inflatum is a deposit feeder. During the spawning period S. inflatum undergoes epitoky.

Systematics
Scalibregma inflatum is found within the polychaete family Scalibregmatidae. The genus Scalibregma is composed of 15 different species.

References

Polychaetes
Animals described in 1843
Taxa named by Martin Rathke
Cosmopolitan animals